Marleyimyia xylocopae is a species of bee fly from South Africa that has a similarity to the patterning of a carpenter bee Xylocopa flavicollis  found in the region. The species is considered to be distinctive and only one of three within the genus Marleyimyia. The other members of the genus are Marleyimyia goliath described from Peninsular Malaysia and M. natalensis from southern Africa. Members in the genus have been presumed to be crepuscular or nocturnal but this species was found to be diurnal.

Controversy about photography-based taxonomy
The species was unusual in being described on the basis of two photographs, without the collection, designation of a holotype specimen and deposition in a suitable repository. This method provoked in 2016 a controversy among taxonomists, with a paper arguing for photography-based taxonomy by Pape  (with 34 signatories), quickly followed by papers arguing against it by Krell  (with 5 signatories) and Ceríaco et al. (with 496 authors).

See also
 Eulophophyllum kirki  — a katydid described only from photographs.

References

Bombyliidae
Insects of South Africa
Insects described in 2015